The 2019 Africa Cup of Nations qualification matches were organized by the Confederation of African Football (CAF) to decide the participating teams of the 2019 Africa Cup of Nations, the 32nd edition of the international men's football championship of Africa.

As per the decision of the CAF Executive Committee on 20 July 2017, a total of 24 teams qualified to play in the final tournament.

Draw
A total of 51 teams entered the tournament, including Cameroon which would have qualified automatically for the final tournament as the hosts before their hosting rights were stripped. The draw for the qualifications stage took place on 12 January 2017, 19:30 UTC+1, in Libreville, Gabon.

Seeding
For seeding, the teams were ranked using CAF's own system which were calculated based on the team's performance in the three most recent editions the Africa Cup of Nations final tournaments, the three most recent editions the Africa Cup of Nations qualifying campaigns, and the 2014 FIFA World Cup final tournament and qualifying campaign.

The teams ranked 1–45 (Pots 1–4) directly entered the group stage, while the teams ranked 46–51 (Pot 5) entered the preliminary round.

Notes

Procedure
The nine teams from Pot 4 were drawn in Groups D to L, while the twelve teams from each of the Pots 3, 2 and 1 were drawn in Groups A to L. Then, the six teams from Pot 5 were drawn into three pairings, which would play in the preliminary round. The three winners would advance to Groups A, B and C of the group stage.

Schedule
The schedule of the qualifying tournament was as follows.

Matchday 2 was postponed at the request of the 2018 FIFA World Cup qualified teams so that they could play friendly matches in March 2018 to prepare for the World Cup.

Preliminary round

The six teams were drawn into three ties, played in home-and-away two-legged format. The three winners advanced to the group stage to join the 45 teams which entered directly.

Group stage
The 48 teams were drawn into 12 groups of four teams (from Group A to Group L). They consisted of the 45 teams which entered directly, plus the three winners of the preliminary round whose identity was not known at the time of the draw.

The original host Cameroon was drawn into Group B. With the team guaranteed a spot in the finals regardless of its ranking in the group, its matches would have counted in determining the qualification of the other teams.

All group winners plus three best runners-up would have qualified for the finals. From Group B, if Cameroon had finished first or second, the other team placed in the top 2 would have qualified too and no other team would have been eligible to qualify, while if Cameroon had finished third or fourth, the group winner would have qualified and the runner-up would have been eligible to qualify as one of the three best runners-up.

On 20 July 2017, when the first round of the qualifying group stage had already been played, the final tournament was expanded from 16 to 24 teams. Under the new format, the best-placed team other than Cameroon would have qualified from Group B, while the group winners and runners-up would have qualified from all other groups.

On 30 November 2018 Cameroon was stripped of the hosting rights. The team lost its automatic spot for the finals but still could qualify through the qualification process, which it eventually did. On 8 January 2019 Egypt was named as the replacement host. As at that point Egypt had already been assured of a top 2 finish in Group J, the winners and runners-up from all qualification groups would now qualify for the final tournament.

Tiebreakers
The teams were ranked according to points (3 points for a win, 1 point for a draw, 0 points for a loss). If tied on points, tiebreakers were applied in the following order (Regulations Article 14):
Points in head-to-head matches among tied teams;
Goal difference in head-to-head matches among tied teams;
Goals scored in head-to-head matches among tied teams;
Away goals scored in head-to-head matches among tied teams;
If more than two teams were tied, and after applying all head-to-head criteria above, a subset of teams were still tied, all head-to-head criteria above were reapplied exclusively to this subset of teams;
Goal difference in all group matches;
Goals scored in all group matches;
Away goals scored in all group matches;
Drawing of lots.

Group A

Group B

Group C

Group D

Group E

Group F

Group G

Group H

Group I

Group J

Group K

Group L

Qualified teams

The following 24 teams qualified for the final tournament.

1 Bold indicates champion for that year. Italic indicates host for that year.

Goalscorers

7 goals
 Odion Ighalo

6 goals
 Fiston Abdul Razak

5 goals

 El Fardou Ben Nabouhane
 Knowledge Musona

4 goals

 Mateus Galiano
 Mohamed Salah
 Anis Saltou
 Percy Tau
 Naim Sliti

3 goals

 Baghdad Bounedjah
 Gelson
 Cédric Amissi
 Thievy Bifouma
 Cédric Bakambu
 Trézéguet
 Emilio Nsue
 Frédéric Mendy
 William Jebor
 Ahmad Benali
 Carolus Andriamatsinoro
 Faneva Imà Andriatsima
 Paulin Voavy
 Ismaël Diakité
 Hakim Ziyech
 Jacques Tuyisenge
 M'Baye Niang
 Farouk Miya
 Justin Shonga
 Khama Billiat

2 goals

 Riyad Mahrez
 Steve Mounié
 Aristide Bancé
 Bertrand Traoré
 Eric Maxim Choupo-Moting
 Ricardo Gomes
 Prince Ibara
 Marwan Mohsen
 Denis Bouanga
 Assan Ceesay
 Jordan Ayew
 Raphael Dwamena
 François Kamano
 Piqueti
 Eric Bailly
 Maxwel Cornet
 Seydou Doumbia
 Jonathan Kodjia
 Michael Olunga
 Hamdou Elhouni
 Mohamed Zubya
 Kalifa Coulibaly
 Adama Traoré
 Youssef En-Nesyri
 Stanley Ratifo
 Reginaldo
 Peter Shalulile
 Victorien Adebayor
 Ahmed Musa
 Idrissa Gueye
 Moussa Sow
 Lebo Mothiba
 James Moga
 Simon Msuva
 Mbwana Samatta
 Firas Chaouat
 Taha Yassine Khenissi
 Yassine Meriah
 Emmanuel Okwi
 Augustine Mulenga

1 goal

 Mehdi Abeid
 Youcef Attal
 Ramy Bensebaini
 Sofiane Hanni
 Djalma
 Wilson Eduardo
 Sessi D'Almeida
 David Djigla
 Stéphane Sessègnon
 Keeagile Kobe
 Issoufou Dayo
 Banou Diawara
 Jonathan Pitroipa
 Abdou Razack Traoré
 Saido Berahino
 Gaël Duhayindavyi
 Vincent Aboubakar
 Stéphane Bahoken
 Christian Bassogog
 Clinton N'Jie
 Djaniny
 Stopira
 Junior Gourrier
 Habib Habibou
 Salif Kéïta
 Geoffrey Kondogbia
 Chaker Alhadhur
 Nasser Chamed
 Benjaloud Youssouf
 Merveil Ndockyt
 Prince Oniangué
 Mohamed Salem Breik
 Abdi Idleh Hamza
 Yannick Bolasie
 Kabongo Kasongo
 Chancel Mbemba
 Elia Meschak
 Ayman Ashraf
 Ahmed Elmohamady
 Baher El Mohamady
 Mohamed Elneny
 Ahmed Hegazi
 Salah Mohsen
 Amr Warda
 Pablo Ganet
 Pedro Obiang
 Sibonginkosi Gamedze
 Sifiso Nkambule
 Getaneh Kebede
 Aaron Appindangoyé
 Pierre-Emerick Aubameyang
 André Biyogo Poko
 Mamadou Danso
 Ablie Jallow
 Lamin Jallow
 Bubacarr Jobe
 John Boye
 Asamoah Gyan
 Ebenezer Ofori
 Jeffrey Schlupp
 Ibrahima Cissé
 Sadio Diallo
 José Kanté
 Naby Keïta
 Seydouba Soumah
 Mohamed Yattara
 Carlos Embaló
 Edigeison Gomes
 Toni Silva
 Cheick Doukouré
 Max Gradel
 Nicolas Pépé
 Jean Michaël Seri
 Eric Johana Omondi
 Victor Wanyama
 Nkau Lerotholi
 Sera Motebang
 Thapelo Tale
 Teah Dennis Jr.
 Sam Johnson
 Rabi Al-Shadi
 Muaid Ellafi
 Salem Roma
 Khaled Majdi
 Motasem Sabbou
 Njiva Rakotoharimalala
 Gerald Phiri Jr.
 Patrick Phiri
 Yves Bissouma
 Salif Coulibaly
 Moussa Djenepo
 Moussa Doumbia
 Mamadou Fofana
 Moussa Marega
 Adama Ba
 Khassa Camara
 Moctar Sidi El Hacen
 Mohamed Soudani
 Kévin Bru
 Nordin Amrabat
 Khalid Boutaïb
 Fayçal Fajr
 Nelson Divrassone
 Mexer
 Zainadine
 Deon Hotto
 Benson Shilongo
 Petrus Shitembi
 Amadou Moutari
 Youssouf Oumarou
 Chidozie Awaziem
 Samuel Kalu
 Henry Onyekuru
 Moses Simon
 Meddie Kagere
 Ernest Sugira
 Harramiz
 Zé
 Keita Baldé
 Pape Abou Cissé
 Moussa Konaté
 Sidy Sarr
 Leroy Coralie
 Rody Melanie
 Perry Monnaie
 Umaru Bangura
 Julius Wobay
 Thulani Hlatshwayo
 Teboho Mokoena
 Lebo Mothiba
 Dino Ndlovu
 Tokelo Rantie
 Dominic Aboi
 Leon Uso Khamis
 Atak Lual
 Dominic Abui Pretino
 Athir Thomas
 Duku Wurube
 Abuaagla Abdalla
 Seif Teiri
 Athar El Tahir
 Mohamed Musa Idris
 Yasir Muzamil
 Aggrey Morris
 Erasto Nyoni
 Emmanuel Adebayor
 Floyd Ayité
 Kévin Denkey
 Kodjo Fo-Doh Laba
 Anice Badri
 Syam Ben Youssef
 Patrick Kaddu
 Geoffrey Sserunkuma
 Lazarous Kambole
 Donashano Malama
 Stoppila Sunzu
 Ronald Pfumbidzai

1 own goal

 Omar Ngando
 Luis Meseguer
 Nicholas Opoku
 Jordão Diogo
 Kalidou Koulibaly
 Nigel Hoareau
 Buhle Mkhwanazi
 Hassan James
 Teenage Hadebe

References

External links
32nd Edition Of Total Africa Cup Of Nations, CAFonline.com

 
2019
Qualification
2017 in African football
2018 in African football
2019 in African football
March 2017 sports events in Africa
June 2017 sports events in Africa
September 2018 sports events in Africa
October 2018 sports events in Africa
November 2018 sports events in Africa
March 2019 sports events in Africa